Port7Alliance was a North American hacker group responsible for production of the internet based magazine Radical Future. Radical Future's presence as an electronic magazine was of cultural significance to the online American hacker community. The e-zine was freely distributed online as an Adobe Acrobat PDF file and consisted of five issues.

History
Port7Alliance was thought of by a 14-year-old computer enthusiast named Darien, on January 13, 2001 after watching an IBM commercial featuring Avery Brooks. Avery Brooks explains the definition of an epiphany in the commercial.

Darien then took on the hacker handle of 'Epiphany'. To promote the Port7alliance, Epiphany wrote his own manifesto concerning the significance of the term computer hacker. The manifesto, simply titled Epiphany has been archived by textfiles.com.

In the Spring of 2002, Port7alliance released their first issue of Radical Future.

Radical Future ezine
Radical Future ran intermittently from the Spring of 2002 to the Spring of 2004 and was briefly available for sale in printed form at The 5th H.O.P.E..

Present time
Port7Alliance has disbanded. However, its site is still live. Certain members of Port7alliance can still be found at hacker cons such as DEF CON or H.O.P.E.

References

Hacker groups